Colonial Heights is the name of several places in the United States:

Colonial Heights, Virginia
Colonial Heights, Tennessee
Colonial Heights, Lawrence, Massachusetts
Colonial Heights Neighborhood, Yonkers, New York